José "Pepe" Gálvez Estévez (born 3 August 1974 in Calvià, Majorca, Balearic Islands) is a Spanish retired footballer who played as a striker, and is a manager.

He amassed La Liga totals of 177 matches and 34 goals during eight seasons, in representation of Mallorca (two spells), Valencia and Betis. He later worked with the first club as a manager.

Club career
At the age of only 17, Gálvez became RCD Mallorca's youngest player ever to appear in a La Liga match, his first chance being awarded by manager Lorenzo Serra Ferrer. With three goals in 22 games from the player, the Balearic Islands club would eventually suffer top flight relegation in 1992.

After a solid 1992–93 season, even though Mallorca failed to regain their lost status, Gálvez was bought by Valencia CF, where he would be used intermittently. In his third year, as the latter finished in second position four points behind champions Atlético Madrid, he scored 11 goals in 28 matches (27 starts), only being surpassed in the squad by Serb Predrag Mijatović's 28.

Injury prevented Gálvez from taking part in the 1996 Summer Olympics tournament, and he could never reproduce his previous form in the following campaigns, with Valencia also loaning him to Mallorca for one and a half years. In 1998 he signed for Real Betis, being relegated from the top division in 2000 and immediately promoting back, but only netting four times combined for the Andalusians during this timeframe.

After one season in Segunda División with Burgos CF, ending in relegation, Gálvez retired from professional football at only 27, playing one more year in amateur football in his native region.

Gálvez served as assistant manager to Albert Ferrer at Mallorca, and took over the team on an interim basis on 30 November 2015 when the former Spanish international was sacked with the team in the second division's relegation zone. Six days later on his professional managerial debut, he led the team to a 2–0 home win over Albacete Balompié; this was his one win in six outings before the permanent appointment of Fernando Vázquez on 18 January.

In December 2016, Gálvez was hired at RCD Mallorca B in Segunda División B, taking over a club that was a candidate for promotion. The team were instead relegated to Tercera División because of the fate of the first team, and he left at the end of his contract in June 2018.

Managerial statistics

Honours
Spain U17
FIFA U-17 World Cup: Runner-up 1991

Spain U21
UEFA European Under-21 Championship: Third-place 1994

References

External links

CiberChe biography and stats 
Betisweb stats and bio 

1974 births
Living people
Spanish footballers
Footballers from Mallorca
Association football forwards
La Liga players
Segunda División players
Segunda División B players
RCD Mallorca B players
RCD Mallorca players
Valencia CF players
Real Betis players
Burgos CF footballers
Spain youth international footballers
Spain under-21 international footballers
Spanish football managers
Segunda División managers
RCD Mallorca managers
RCD Mallorca B managers